Pshav-Khevsureti National Park is in Dusheti Municipality, Mtskheta-Mtianeti region of Georgia. Park has been established by direct involvement of World Wide Fund for Nature.

Fauna 
Pshav-Khevsureti National Park will help conservation of the leopard (Panthera pardus) in the Caucasus, as well as the Bezoar goat (Capra aegagrus aegagrus), endemic East Caucasian tur (Capra caucasica cylindricornis), brown bear, European lynx, Caucasian red deer, chamois.

Tourist infrastructure 
Pshav-Khevsureti National Park can be reached using Tbilisi-Zhinvali-Barisakho-Shatili route

See also 
List of protected areas of Georgia

References

National parks of Georgia (country)
Protected areas established in 2014